Alfonso Ponce de León y Cabello (10 September 1906 – 29 September 1936) was a Spanish painter and propagandist. He was the son of jurist . He was also associated with Federico García Lorca's theater group, La Barraca as a scene painter. In 2001 the Reina Sofía curated a retrospective exhibition of his work. He was married to fellow painter . A member of Falange (helming the organization's propaganda apparatus) since circa 1935, he was killed in 1936 during the Spanish Civil War. His most famous work, Autorretrato (accidente) is housed in the Reina Sofia's permanent collection.

References

20th-century Spanish painters
20th-century Spanish male artists
1906 births
1936 deaths
Real Academia de Bellas Artes de San Fernando alumni
People killed in the Spanish Civil War
Spanish Falangists